The 1935 Ball State Cardinals football team was an American football team that represented Ball State Teachers College (later renamed Ball State University) as a member of the Indiana Intercollegiate Conference (IIC) during the 1935 college football season. The Cardinals compiled a 3–4–1 record (3–4–1 against IIC opponents), and finished in eighth place out of 15 teams in the conference, and outscored opponents by a total of 77 to 66.

John Magnabosco was hired as Ball State's head football coach in May 1935, following the resignation of Lawrence McPhee. Magnabosco remained as Ball State's head football coach for the next 18 years. He had been the head football coach at Clinton High School for four years prior to his hiring. 

The team played its home games at Ball State Athletic Field in Muncie, Indiana.

Schedule

References

Ball State
Ball State Cardinals football seasons
Ball State Cardinals football